Noel "Duck Egg" Kirwan was shot dead on 22 December 2016. He had been friends with Gerry "the Monk" Hutch all his life.

Background
He lived in Jude's Gardens off Railway Street in Dublin, then lived in Summerhill, Dublin. He was friends with Gerry Hutch and other members of the Hutch family. His father worked in the docks and he inherited his nickname.

In the 1990s he was involved in the anti-drugs movement.

He was charged with possession of a firearm or imitation firearm for intimidation in Ballybough Road in 1996, but people in north inner city Dublin said he hadn't been involved in crime in some time.

He had moved to Kilbarrack some years before being killed and later to Ronanstown with his partner.

He drove Gerry Hutch to the funeral of his brother Eddie earlier that year.

He had been formally notified that his life was in danger shortly after the funeral.

Shooting
He and his partner had just had lunch with her daughter in Crumlin. He and his partner were sitting in the car outside their home when he was shot six times with a Makarov handgun.

Aftermath

Trial of Jason Keating
Jason Keating was put on trial for murdering Kirwan, but the murder charge was dropped when he admitted participating in the activities of a criminal gang and helping them to murder Kirwan.

A tracker device had been fitted to the underside of Kirwan's car and Keating took part in retrieving it and transferring it to his new car two days before he was killed. Keating was in the getaway car, talking to the person following the tracker on a laptop and passing on the information to the gunman. He brought the gunman to and from the crime scene and was involved via CCTV footage and the purchase of a "burner" phone. Keating was sentenced to ten years in prison. Gardaí told the special criminal court that the only motive they could find for his killing was his association with the Monk.

2022 arrests
On 14 April 2022 Declan "Mr Nobody" Brady and Martin Aylmer were charged with involvement in the murder, contrary to Section 72 of the Criminal Justice Act. Brady is a senior member of the Kinahan Organised Crime Group. Michael Crotty was charged with involvement on 12 April 2022.

References

2016 deaths
People murdered in the Republic of Ireland
Deaths by firearm in the Republic of Ireland
Deaths by person in the Republic of Ireland
Organised crime events in Ireland
December 2016 crimes in Europe
December 2016 events in Ireland